John Tradescant the Younger (4 August 1608 – 22 April 1662), son of John Tradescant the Elder, was a botanist and gardener. The standard author abbreviation Trad. is applied to species he described.

Biography 
Son of John Tradescant the Elder, he was born in Meopham, Kent, and educated at The King's School, Canterbury. Like his father, who collected specimens and rarities on his many trips abroad, he undertook collecting expeditions to Virginia between 1628 and 1637 (and possibly two more trips by 1662, though Potter and other authors doubt this). Among the seeds he brought back, to introduce to English gardens were great American trees, including magnolias, bald cypress and tulip tree, and garden plants such as phlox and asters.

John Tradescant the Younger added his American acquisitions to the family's cabinet of curiosities, known as The Ark. These included the ceremonial cloak of Chief Powhatan, an important Native American relic. South Lambeth Road in Vauxhall was one of the boundaries of the Tradescant estate, where the collection was kept and Tradescant Road was laid out after the estate was built on in the 1870s and named after the family.

When his father died, he succeeded as head gardener to Charles I and Henrietta Maria of France, making gardens at the Queen's House, Greenwich, designed by Inigo Jones, from 1638 to 1642, when the queen fled the Civil War.  He published the contents of his father's celebrated collection as Musaeum Tradescantianum—books, coins, weapons, costumes, taxidermy, and other curiosities—dedicating the first edition to the Royal College of Physicians (with whom he was negotiating for the transfer of his botanic garden), and the second edition to the recently restored Charles II. Tradescant bequeathed his library and museum to (or some say it was swindled from him by) Elias Ashmole (1617–1692), whose name it bears as the core of the Ashmolean Museum in Oxford where the Tradescant collections remain largely intact.

He was buried beside his father in the churchyard of St-Mary-at-Lambeth which is now established as the Garden Museum.

He is the subject of the novel Virgin Earth by Philippa Gregory, sequel to Earthly Joys about his father.

The standard author abbreviation Trad. is applied to species he described.

Marriages and issue
Jane Hurte, died 1634
John, died age 19
Frances, married Alexander Norman
Ester (Hester) Pooks

Gallery

Notes

References
.

External links

Tradescant Collection at the Ashmolean Museum
Vauxhall Society
Death of Hester Tradescant The story of Ashmole's obsession and the mysterious death of Hester Tradescant, widow of the younger John, told in the style of a modern newspaper article.

17th-century English botanists
Botanists with author abbreviations
English gardeners
People from Meopham
People educated at The King's School, Canterbury
History of museums
1608 births
1662 deaths
People associated with the Ashmolean Museum